We Came as Romans is the fourth studio album by American metalcore band We Came as Romans. It was released on July 24, 2015 through Equal Vision Records. As with Tracing Back Roots, the album continues to see a departure of the band's metalcore sound found in their previous albums, in favor of an melodic rock sound.

The album's first single, "The World I Used to Know", was released on May 26, 2015.

This is the last album to feature long time drummer Eric Choi before his departure from the band in early October 2016. This is also the band's final album on Equal Vision Records.

The album sold 22,600 copies in its first week, being considered a solid release despite selling less than their 2013 record, Tracing Back Roots, that sold over 26,500 copies in its debut week.

Genre
According to Kill Your Stereo, the band continues to "grow out of their heavier metalcore roots and move towards a more alternative metal, melodic direction" with their self-titled album featuring a "more mature" sound.

Background
Singer Dave Stephens has said that the songwriting was very intense with new producer David Bendeth. 40 songs were written for the album, but only 10 made it onto the final track list. The album's cover painting was done by Paul Romano, who also created the cover of the first three albums To Plant a Seed (2009), Understanding What We've Grown to Be (2012) and Tracing Back Roots (2013).

The album was streamed via Soundcloud on July 21, through the Huffington Post and Kerrang websites.

Videos
On June 8, 2015 the music video for the first track on the album, "Regenerate" was posted on the Equal Vision Records YouTube channel and We Came As Romans VEVO channel also, due to signing with Spinefarm on Europe. On July 23, 2015, the music video for "The World I Used to Know" was posted on VEVO. On December 16, 2015 the band premiered the music video for "Who Will Pray?" exclusively with Kerrang!. The video was posted on VEVO and YouTube soon after.

Critical reception

We Came as Romans received mixed reviews from critics and fans, mostly because of their departure from the metalcore sound from their previous albums. Awarding the album four stars from Alternative Press, Mischa Pearlman states, "The 10 songs are full of catchy hooks that aren't full-on pop, but aren't too far off, either ... We Came As Romans lends weight to the glossy sheen of songs that might otherwise be dismissed as too slick and too superficial."

Track listing

Personnel
We Came as Romans
 David Stephens – lead vocals
 Kyle Pavone – clean vocals, keyboards, piano, synthesizer
 Joshua Moore – lead guitar, backing vocals
 Lou Cotton – rhythm guitar
 Andy Glass – bass guitar, backing vocals
 Eric Choi – drums, percussion

Production
 David Bendeth – record producer, mixing, arrangements
 Ted Jensen – mastering at Sterling Sound, New York, NY
 Aaron Marsh, Nick Sampson, Scott Stevens – programming
 Michael "Mitch" Milan – engineering, programming, digital editing
 Adam Mott and Rick Sales – management
 Jacoby Nelson – engineering, digital editing
 Brian Robbins – digital editing, engineering, mix engineering, programming
 Greg Johnson - programming
 Paul A. Romano – art direction, artwork & design
 Daniel Sandshaw – A&R
 Bill Scoville – design

Charts

References

2015 albums
Equal Vision Records albums
Nuclear Blast albums
We Came as Romans albums
Alternative metal albums by American artists
Nu metal albums by American artists